Nézobly (also spelled Bazobli) is a town in the far west of Ivory Coast, near the border with Liberia. It is a sub-prefecture of Toulépleu Department in Cavally Region, Montagnes District. The town is approximately three kilometres from the border, but there is no official border crossing in the vicinity.

Nézobly was a commune until March 2012, when it became one of 1126 communes nationwide that were abolished.

In 2014, the population of the sub-prefecture of Nézobly was 6,679.

Villages
The 8 villages of the sub-prefecture of Nézobly and their population in 2014 are:
 Kahibli (637)
 Klaon (906)
 Kpably (662)
 Nézobly (1 911)
 Tiabolébly 1 (523)
 Touaplébli (704)
 Toyébli (1 072)
 Zaïgbopleu (264)

Notes

Sub-prefectures of Cavally Region
Former communes of Ivory Coast